is a Japanese professional baseball catcher for the Hiroshima Toyo Carp.

He was selected .

International career 
Yamada represented the Japan national baseball team in the 2010 Intercontinental Cup, 2015 exhibition games against Europe, 2018 MLB Japan All-Star Series and 2019 WBSC Premier12.

On October 10, 2018, he was selected at the 2018 MLB Japan All-Star Series.

On October 1, 2019, he was selected at the 2019 WBSC Premier12.

References

External links

1988 births
Living people
Hiroshima Toyo Carp players
Japanese baseball players
Nippon Professional Baseball catchers
Baseball people from Ibaraki Prefecture
People from Hitachi, Ibaraki
2019 WBSC Premier12 players